Catherine Perret (born 9 July 1956 in Paris) is associate professor of modern and contemporary aesthetics and theory at Nanterre University (Paris X). She obtained her Ph.D. in philosophy and is known for her work on Walter Benjamin, most notably by her book Walter Benjamin ou la critique en effet. Dr. Perret was the director of the Art of Exhibition Department at Paris X. She served as a program director at the Collège International de Philosophie from 1995 to 2001. She is a recipient of the prestigious title Chevalier des Palmes académiques. She collaborated with Bernard Stiegler in Ars Industrialis. Dr. Perret is currently responsible for the Centre de recherche sur l'art, philosophie, esthétique (CRéART - PHI) at Paris X.

Reference books and texts
 Walter Benjamin sans destin, Ed. La Différence, Paris, 1992, rééd. revue et augmentée d'une préface, Bruxelles, éd. La Lettre volée, 2007. 
Marcel Duchamp, le manieur de gravité, Ed. CNDP, Paris, 1998
Rapport "(non publié) pour le Ministère de la Culture et de la Communication : L'art contemporain et la question de son exposition (2001). 
Les porteurs d'ombre, mimésis et modernité, coll. L'extrême contemporain, Ed. Belin, Paris, 2002. 
Olivier Mosset, la peinture, même, éditions Ides et Calendes, Lausanne, mars 2004.
Non Compatibles, Une peinture sans qualités, une exposition de Catherine Perret, éditions Les Presses du réel, Dijon, 2006

Art exhibitions curated
Unlimited Space 1, Paris, Galerie Les Filles du Calvaire, Avril-Juin, 2000
Unlimited Space 2,  Bruxelles, Galerie Les Filles du Calvaire, Janvier-Mars, 2001
Tableaux-Ecrans, Paris, Bruxelles, Galerie les Filles du Calvaire, Février-Avril, 2004
Non Compatibles, une peinture sans qualités, Toulon, Villa Tamaris, Novembre-Janvier, 2005
Fetish and Konsum, Stuttgart, Akademie Solitude, Mai-Juin, 2008

References

External links
Our Digital Noology: Catherine Perret in conversation with Joseph Nechvatal

1956 births
Living people
Writers from Paris
Academic staff of the University of Paris
French art critics
French women academics
Philosophers of art
Mass media theorists
French art curators
French women philosophers
Continental philosophers
Postmodern theory
Walter Benjamin scholars
20th-century French philosophers
21st-century French philosophers
20th-century French women writers
21st-century French women writers
French women art critics
20th-century French translators
21st-century translators
French women curators